Sergio Trujillo is a theater director and choreographer. Born in Colombia and raised in Toronto, Canada, he is now an American citizen and resides in New York City. Trujillo was the recipient of the 2019 Tony Award for Best Choreography for Ain't Too Proud and the 2015 Laurence Olivier Award for Best Theatre Choreographer for Memphis. He is the first ever Hispanic recipient of the Tony Award for Best Choreography. 

He received his first Emmy Award nomination in 2021 for NBC’s Christmas in Rockefeller Center.

Biography 
Trujillo was born in Cali, Colombia and moved to the Canada suburb of North York, Toronto with his family at age 12. He is very close with his mother, Sara Trujillo, and his sister, Amparo Casilimas. His beloved father, Reynaldo Trujillo, as well as his brother, Reinaldo Trujillo, are deceased. Trujillo named his production company Two Kings Productions in memory of his father and brother. 

He studied science at the University of Toronto and then attended chiropractic school. However, he left school to pursue a dance career in New York City.

Of his desire to be a choreographer he said: "I knew that “Fosse” would be my last show as a dancer when I began feeling limited by somebody else’s work. I didn’t get to express myself, and I needed to do something about it."

In 2011, Trujillo had the honor of having four shows simultaneously running on Broadway: Tony Award winning Best Musical Memphis (Olivier Award, Outer Critics Circle Award, Drama Desk and Astaire Award nominations), Tony and Olivier Award winning Best Musical Jersey Boys (Greenroom Award, Olivier, Drama Desk, Dora, Outer Critics Circle Award nominations), The Addams Family, and Next to Normal, the recipient of the 2010 Pulitzer Prize.

Broadway and off-broadway 
Trujillo made his Broadway debut as a performer in Jerome Robbins' Broadway in 1989. He also appeared in Guys and Dolls (1992), Victor/Victoria (1998) and Fosse (1999). He made his choreographic debut in 2005 with All Shook Up, followed up by Jersey Boys the same year.

Trujillo is the choreographer of the Broadway production of Summer: The Donna Summer Musical which earned him a 2018 Chita Rivera Award for Dance and Choreography. Other Broadway credits include: On Your Feet! (Tony Award Nomination, Astaire Award), Hands on a Hardbody (Drama Desk nomination), Leap of Faith (Drama Desk Nomination), and Guys and Dolls (Astaire Awards nomination).

Off-Broadway he choreographed Paul Simon's The Capeman at the Public Theater, Invisible Thread (2015 Lucille Lortel Award Nomination), Bare: A Pop Opera (2004), A Tree Grows in Brooklyn for City Center Encores!, The Great American Trailer Park Musical (2005), The Public Theater — Shakespeare in the Park (New York City's production of Romeo & Juliet (2007), Kismet for Encores! and Saved (2008) for Playwrights Horizons (Lucille Lortel Award nomination).

He directed Gloria Estefan & Miami Sound Machine on Broadway at the Minskoff Theatre and was the director/choreographer of digital concert ¡Viva Broadway! Hear Our Voices.

Regional and international theater 
He was the director and choreographer for Arrabal at the American Repertory Theater in Boston which earned him an Elliot Norton Awards for direction, Cirque Du Soleil’s Paramour, as well as Flashdance the Musical, which had a North America tour from  2013 to 15.

His regional theatre credits include Mambo Kings (San Francisco), Zhivago and The Wiz at the La Jolla Playhouse in San Diego, a US tour of Kiss of the Spider Woman (performer, mid-1990s) and West Side Story in 1999 and 2009 at the Stratford Festival, Canada. He also choreographed at the Village Theatre for their musical staging of The Wedding Banquet (2003). In the West End he choreographed Peggy Sue Got Married.  In 2007, he also choreographed the Disney musical Tarzan in Scheveningen.

Additional theatre credits include: Carmen; An Afro-Cuban Musical (Helen Hayes Award nomination), Kiss of the Spider Woman (North Shore Music Theatre), Kiss Me Kate (Tokyo), Needfire (Royal Alexandra Theatre), a musical adaptation of Twelfth Night (Tokyo), and segments of Chita Rivera's Chita and All That Jazz.

Opera 
Trujillo choreographed The Marriage of Figaro for Los Angeles Opera and Salome for the New York City Opera.

Personal life 
Sergio Trujillo was distinguished as one of the Top 100 Colombians in the world by President Juan Manuel Santos and was voted as one of the top 50 Creative Colombian Artists in the world by Forbes Magazine.

He is the first choreographer ever invited to serve as a voting member of the American Theatre Wing’s Advisory Committee for the Tony Awards, and serves on the advisory boards of R.Evolutión Latina and New York Theatre Barn. He is an active member of the Stage Directors and Choreographers Society.

Trujillo married his long-time partner, actor Jack Noseworthy, in 2011 after 21 years together. Trujillo and Noseworthy welcomed son Lucas Alejandro Truworthy, in 2018.

Awards and nominations
Source: Internet Broadway Database

 2021 Emmy Award for Outstanding Choreography - Christmas in Rockefeller Center (nominee)
2019 Tony Award for Best Choreography — Ain't Too Proud (winner)
 2016 Tony Award Best Choreography — On Your Feet! (nominee)
 2015 Olivier Award Best Theatre Choreographer — Memphis the Musical (winner)
 2013 Drama Desk Award Outstanding Choreography — Hands on a Hardbody (nominee)
 2012 Drama Desk Award Outstanding Choreography — Leap of Faith (nominee)
 2010 Drama Desk Award Outstanding Choreography — Memphis (nominee)
 2009 Lucille Lortel Award Outstanding Choreographer — Saved (nominee)
 2006 Drama Desk Award Outstanding Choreography — Jersey Boys (nominee)
 2010 Outer Critics Circle Award for Outstanding Choreography — Memphis (winner tie)
 2016 Outer Critics Circle Award for Outstanding Choreography  — On Your Feet
 2018 Elliot Norton Awards for Outstanding Director, Large Theater — Arrabal (winner)
 2003 Ovation Awards for Outstanding Choreography — Empire: A New Musical

References

External links

Internet Off-Broadway Database listing
Sergio Trujillo on the American Theatre Wing's documentary series "Working in the Theatre" on choreography in 2016.

1963 births
American choreographers
American male dancers
Colombian choreographers
Colombian emigrants to the United States
Colombian expatriates in Canada
Colombian male dancers
Gay dancers
Laurence Olivier Award winners
LGBT choreographers
Colombian gay men
Living people
American people of Colombian descent
Tony Award winners
University of Toronto alumni